Spyridon Stais (1859–1932) was a Greek politician from the island of Kythera.

He studied physics and mathematics and served as a teacher in gymnasia (secondary schools) of Greece. He became active in politics in 1892, joining first the party of Charilaos Trikoupis and later (after Trikoupis’ death) the Modernist Party of Georgios Theotokis. He served as a member of parliament, as Minister for Education under prime minister Theotokis (in 1900 and again in 1903), as Minister of the Interior (1921–1922) under Dimitrios Gounaris and finally as general governor of Thessaloniki (1922) under Petros Protopapadakis.

In some recent publications dealing with the Antikythera Mechanism, the name of Spyridon Stais has been confused with that of the archaeologist Valerios Stais, the discoverer of that archaeological find.

References

1859 births
1932 deaths
Greek educators
People from Kythira
Ministers of the Interior of Greece